The 2009 KONI Sports Car Challenge was the ninth running of the Grand American Road Racing Association's support series. It began on January 22 and ran for ten rounds.

Schedule
Daytona International Speedway
Homestead Miami Speedway
New Jersey Motorsports Park
Mazda Raceway Laguna Seca
Lime Rock Park*
Watkins Glen International
Mid-Ohio Sports Car Course
Barber Motorsports Park
Circuit de Trois-Rivieres
Miller Motorsports Park
Virginia International Raceway

*Split classes

See also
2009 Continental Tire Sports Car Challenge season

References

2010
KONI Sports Car Challenge